Silver Creek was a historical stream in present San Jose, California, corresponding to the modern-day Upper Silver Creek and Lower Silver Creek, tributaries to Coyote Creek.

Silver Creek did not originally connect directly to Coyote Creek, but flowed into and out of a marshy area within Rancho Yerba Buena known as Laguna Socayre, an area which includes the present-day Lake Cunningham, a floodwater retention basin.  The part above the laguna was diverted to drain directly to Coyote Creek through the Ramblewood neighborhood, and is now known as Upper Silver Creek.  The part below the lake, which takes on the flow of Thompson Creek and other tributaries, and which originally distributed into a large wetland in what is now East San Jose, flows through a large concrete channel to Coyote Creek near Watson Park.  

The final segment of Lower Silver Creek merges with the lower part of Miguelita Creek before joining Coyote Creek.  Some sources describe Miguelita Creek as a major tributary to Lower Silver Creek.
Others show Lower Silver Creek as tributary to Miguelita Creek, in agreement with the GNIS coordinates for the mouth of Miguelita Creek.

Course

Lower Silver Creek:

References

Rivers of Santa Clara County, California